Tyler Light (born c. 1990) is an American professional golfer.

High school and college career 
Light was born in Massillon, Ohio. He competed at Perry High School and then Malone University.

Professional career 
Light competed on the PGA Tour Canada in 2015, where he made three cuts in eleven starts.

At the 2017 U.S. Open, he made the cut on the line at one over. It is the second consecutive year, and the second time overall, that a former Malone University golfer competed in the U.S. Open.

Outside golf 
To financially support his golf career, Light works at United Parcel Service.

Results in major championships

CUT = missed the half-way cut
"T" = tied for place

References 

American male golfers
Golfers from Ohio
Malone University alumni
Sportspeople from Massillon, Ohio
1991 births
Living people